Anson Paul is an Indian actor who has appeared in Malayalam as well as Tamil language films and in many albums including Hindi. Paul made his acting debut in the 2013 Malayalam film, KQ, along with Parvathy Omanakuttan, and was noticed in Su.. Su... Sudhi Vathmeekam  and the tamil blockbuster Remo.

Career
Anson Paul, a Bachelor of Engineering, played a major role in Abrahaminte Santhathikal (2018), along with Mammootty, where his role was reviewed as "fantastic performance, making him one of the promising actors" by Times of India. He also played the lead in The Gambler (2019 film), touted as the first superhero movie of Malayalam film industry.

Filmography
 Films
	

Other Works

Awards
2018: Santosham Film Awards -Best Supporting Actor - Solo

References

External links 

Male actors from Thrissur
1988 births
Living people
Male actors in Malayalam cinema
Indian male film actors
Male actors in Tamil cinema
21st-century Indian male actors